is a passenger railway station in the city of Tateyama, Chiba Prefecture, Japan, operated by the East Japan Railway Company (JR East).

Lines
Nakofunakata Station is served by the Uchibo Line, and is located 82.1 km from the starting point of the line at Soga Station.

Station layout
The station consists of a single island platform serving two tracks. The wooden station building dates from 1918.  The station is unattended.

Platforms

History
Nakofunakata Station was opened on August 10, 1918. The station was absorbed into the JR East network upon the privatization of the Japan National Railways (JNR) on April 1, 1987.

Passenger statistics
In fiscal 2017, the station was used by an average of 175 passengers daily (boarding passengers only).

Surrounding area 
Tateyama Funakata Post Office
Tateyama Nako Post Office
Nago-dera
Funakata Municipal Elementary School
Daifuku-ji
Nako Fishing Port

See also
 List of railway stations in Japan

References

External links

 JR East Station information  

Railway stations in Chiba Prefecture
Railway stations in Japan opened in 1918
Uchibō Line
Tateyama, Chiba